Kaal Sandhya is a 1997 Indian Hindi crime drama film dwelling on militancy in Assam, directed by Bhabendra Nath Saikia. The film deals with the theme of the impact of the insurgency on common people. It stars Jatin Bora, Ashish Vidyarthi, Debashree Roy, Nipon Goswami, Pranjal Saikia, Hemen Barman, Munin Barua and Mridula Baruah in the lead roles.

The film was screened at the International Film Festival of India in New Delhi that year and also as part of the Indian section at the Cairo International Film festival.

Plot summary
Ranjit, an educated and unemployed young man, is drawn into militancy. As armed insurgents indulge in targeted killings he too is involved in the killing of Anuradha's husband. A few days later, a professor of the local college, Banajit Dutta too is shot dead. Ranjit grows close to the family of the professor as time goes by and is tortured by guilt and remorse.

Cast
Debashree Roy
Ashish Vidyarthi
Jatin Bora 
Nipon Goswami
Hemen Barman
Munin Barua
Mridula Baruah
Nikumoni Baruah    
Rajeeb Bhatacharyya    
Upakul Bordoloi    
Chetana Das    
Jayanta Das
Sangeeta Goswami    
Arjun Guha-Thakurta    
Sanjeev Hazarika    
Baharul Islam    
Towfiq Rahman

References

External links

1991 films
1990s Hindi-language films